The 1987 Stanford Cardinal baseball team represented Stanford University in the 1987 NCAA Division I baseball season. The team was coached by Mark Marquess in his 11th season at Stanford.

The Cardinal won the College World Series, defeating the Oklahoma State Cowboys in the championship game.

Roster

Schedule 

! style="background:#990000;color:white;"| Regular Season
|- valign="top" 

|- align="center" bgcolor="#ffdddd"
| January 23 || at  || 1-2 || 0-1 || –
|- align="center" bgcolor="#ddffdd"
| January 26 || at San Jose State || 7-1 || 1-1 || –
|- align="center" bgcolor="#ddffdd"
| February 1 ||  || 6-2 || 2-1 || –
|- align="center" bgcolor="#ddffdd"
| February 4 || at  || 13-2 || 3-1 || –
|- align="center" bgcolor="#ddffdd"
| February 6 || at  || 6-5 || 4-1 || –
|- align="center" bgcolor="#ffdddd"
| February 7 || at Cal State Fullerton || 4-7 || 4-2 || –
|- align="center" bgcolor="#ddffdd"
| February 8 || at Cal State Fullerton || 11-1 || 5-2 || –
|- align="center" bgcolor="#ddffdd"
| February 11 ||  || 13-6 || 6-2 || –
|- align="center" bgcolor="#ddffdd"
| February 14 || at  || 2-0 || 7-2 || –
|- align="center" bgcolor="#ffdddd"
| February 15 || at Fresno State || 2-4 || 7-3 || –
|- align="center" bgcolor="#ffdddd"
| February 16 || at Fresno State || 4-12 || 7-4 || –
|- align="center" bgcolor="#ddffdd"
| February 17 || at  || 10-1 || 8-4 || –
|- align="center" bgcolor="#ffdddd"
| February 20 || at  || 2-10 || 8-5 || –
|- align="center" bgcolor="#ddffdd"
| February 21 || at UC Santa Barbara || 8-6 || 9-5 || –
|- align="center" bgcolor="#ffdddd"
| February 22 || at UC Santa Barbara || 9-10 || 9-6 || –
|- align="center" bgcolor="#ddffdd"
| February 23 || Santa Clara || 10-6 || 10-6 || –
|- align="center" bgcolor="#ddffdd"
| February 24 || Pacific || 10-2 || 11-6 || –
|- align="center" bgcolor="#ffdddd"
| February 27 || at  || 9-17 || 11-7 || 0–1
|- align="center" bgcolor="#ffdddd"
| February 28 || at UCLA || 5-14 || 11-8 || 0–2
|-

|- align="center" bgcolor="#ddffdd"
| March 1 || at UCLA || 13-5 || 12-8 || 1–2
|- align="center" bgcolor="#ddffdd"
| March 3 ||  || 7-0 || 13-8 || –
|- align="center" bgcolor="#ddffdd"
| March 6 ||  || 14-4 || 14-8 || 2–2
|- align="center" bgcolor="#ddffdd"
| March 7 || Arizona || 10-6 || 15-8 || 3–2
|- align="center" bgcolor="#ddffdd"
| March 8 || Arizona || 8-6 || 16-8 || 4–2
|- align="center" bgcolor="#ddffdd"
| March 22 || at  || 7-6 || 17-8 || 5–2
|- align="center" bgcolor="#ddffdd"
| March 23 || San Jose State || 5-3 || 18-8 || –
|- align="center" bgcolor="#ddffdd"
| March 24 || at  || 14-3 || 19-8 || –
|- align="center" bgcolor="#ddffdd"
| March 27 || Arizona State || 10-3 || 20-8 || 6–2
|- align="center" bgcolor="#ddffdd"
| March 28 || Arizona State || 3-2 || 21-8 || 7–2
|- align="center" bgcolor="#ddffdd"
| March 29 || Arizona State || 12-6 || 22-8 || 8–2
|- align="center" bgcolor="#ffdddd"
| March 30 ||  || 3-10 || 22-9 || –
|- align="center" bgcolor="#ddffdd"
| March 31 ||  || 10-0 || 23-9 || –
|-

|- align="center" bgcolor="#ddffdd"
| April 3 || at  || 4-0 || 24-9 || 9–2
|- align="center" bgcolor="#ddffdd"
| April 4 || at Southern California || 9-4 || 25-9 || 10–2
|- align="center" bgcolor="#ffdddd"
| April 5 || at Southern California || 1-3 || 25-10 || 10–3
|- align="center" bgcolor="#ddffdd"
| April 7 || at Santa Clara || 7-4 || 26-10 || –
|- align="center" bgcolor="#ffdddd"
| April 10 || UCLA || 6-14 || 26-11 || 10–3
|- align="center" bgcolor="#ddffdd"
| April 11 || UCLA || 3-2 || 27-11 || 11–3
|- align="center" bgcolor="#ddffdd"
| April 12 || UCLA || 8-6 || 28-11 || 12–3
|- align="center" bgcolor="#ddffdd"
| April 14 || at San Francisco || 18-6 || 29-11 || –
|- align="center" bgcolor="#ffdddd"
| April 16 || at Arizona || 5-10 || 29-12 || 12–4
|- align="center" bgcolor="#ddffdd"
| April 17 || at Arizona || 12-3 || 30-12 || 13–4
|- align="center" bgcolor="#ddffdd"
| April 18 || at Arizona || 14-11 || 31-12 || 14–4
|- align="center" bgcolor="#ddffdd"
| April 20 || California || 6-1 || 32-12 || 15–4
|- align="center" bgcolor="#ddffdd"
| April 21 || at San Jose State || 7-5 || 33-12 || –
|- align="center" bgcolor="#ffdddd"
| April 24 || at Arizona State || 6-10 || 33-13 || 15–5
|- align="center" bgcolor="#ddffdd"
| April 25 || at Arizona State || 13-5 || 34-13 || 16–5
|- align="center" bgcolor="#ffdddd"
| April 26 || at Arizona State || 2-5 || 34-14 || 16–6
|- align="center" bgcolor="#ddffdd"
| April 28 ||  || 3-2 || 35-14 || –
|- align="center" bgcolor="#ddffdd"
| April 29 || at Santa Clara || 21-7 || 36-14 || –
|-

|- align="center" bgcolor="#ddffdd"
| May 3 || Santa Clara || 19-2 || 37-14 || –
|- align="center" bgcolor="#ddffdd"
| May 4 ||  || 11-3 || 38-14 || –
|- align="center" bgcolor="#ddffdd"
| May 5 || at Saint Mary's || 5-4 || 39-14 || –
|- align="center" bgcolor="#ffdddd"
| May 7 || at California || 9-19 || 39-15 || 16–7
|- align="center" bgcolor="#ddffdd"
| May 8 || California || 7-6 || 40-15 || 17–7
|- align="center" bgcolor="#ffdddd"
| May 9 || at California || 6-7 || 40-16 || 17–8
|- align="center" bgcolor="#ddffdd"
| May 10 || California || 11-4 || 41-16 || 18–8
|- align="center" bgcolor="#ddffdd"
| May 15 || Southern California || 3-1 || 42-16 || 19–9
|- align="center" bgcolor="#ddffdd"
| May 16 || Southern California || 4-3 || 43-16 || 20–9
|- align="center" bgcolor="#ddffdd"
| May 17 || Southern California || 10-7 || 44-16 || 21–9
|-

|- align="center" bgcolor="#ddffdd"
| May 22 || vs.  || 12-1 || 45-16
|- align="center" bgcolor="#ddffdd"
| May 23 || vs. UC Santa Barbara || 12-5 || 46-16
|- align="center" bgcolor="#ddffdd"
| May 24 || vs.  || 12-11 || 47-16
|- align="center" bgcolor="#ddffdd"
| May 25 || vs.  || 9-4 || 48-16
|-

|- align="center" bgcolor="ddffdd"
| May 31 || vs.  || Rosenblatt Stadium || 3-2 || 49-16
|- align="center" bgcolor="ddffdd"
| June 2 || vs. Texas || Rosenblatt Stadium || 6-1 || 50-16
|- align="center" bgcolor="ffdddd"
| June 4 || vs. Oklahoma State || Rosenblatt Stadium || 2-6 || 50-17
|- align="center" bgcolor="ddffdd"
| June 5 || vs.  || Rosenblatt Stadium || 6-5 || 51-17
|- align="center" bgcolor="ddffdd"
| June 6 || vs. Texas || Rosenblatt Stadium || 9-3 || 52-17
|- align="center" bgcolor="ddffdd"
| June 7 || vs. Oklahoma State || Rosenblatt Stadium || 9-5 || 53-17
|-

Awards and honors 
Rubén Amaro
 First Team All-American
 First Team All-Pac-10

Steve Chitren
 First Team All-Pac-10

Paul Carey
 College World Series Most Outstanding Player
 NCAA Freshman of the Year

David Esquer
 College World Series All-Tournament Team

Mark Machtolf
 College World Series All-Tournament Team

Jack McDowell
 First Team All-American
 First Team All-Pac-10

Ed Sprague
 First Team All-Pac-10

Cardinal in the 1987 MLB Draft 
The following members of the Stanford Cardinal baseball program were drafted in the 1987 Major League Baseball draft.

References 

Stanford Cardinal
Stanford Cardinal baseball seasons
NCAA Division I Baseball Championship seasons
College World Series seasons
Stanford Cardinal baseball